Eudorus may refer to:

 Eudoros, second of Achilles' five commanders at Troy in Greek mythology 
 Eudorus of Alexandria (1st century BC), Middle Platonist philosopher
 Chrysanthrax eudorus, species of bee fly

See also
 Eudoxus (disambiguation)
 Euporus, genus of beetles
 Eusorus, father of several figures in Greek mythology